The 1969 UCI Track Cycling World Championships were the World Championship for track cycling. The events of the men's sprint and the individual pursuit for professionals were held in Antwerp, Belgium the other events took place in Brno, Czechoslovakia. Eleven events were contested, 9 for men (3 for professionals, 6 for amateurs) and 2 for women between 5 and 9 August 1969.

Medal summary

Medal table

See also
 1969 UCI Road World Championships

References

Track cycling
Track cycling
UCI Track Cycling World Championships by year
International cycle races hosted by Belgium
International cycle races hosted by Czechoslovakia
1969 in track cycling